{{DISPLAYTITLE:C10H12O}}
The molecular formula C10H12O (molar mass: 148.2 g/mol, exact mass: 148.0888 u) may refer to:

 Anethole
 Benzylacetone
 Butyrophenone
 Cuminaldehyde, or 4-isopropylbenzaldehyde
 Estragole